The Hackney, Shoreditch, and Stoke Newington areas of North London, England, have been represented in the House of Commons of the Parliament of the United Kingdom through several parliamentary constituencies. Previous to the enfranchisement by division of the Hackney constituency in 1868, representation in Parliament was by two knights of the shire returned by the county constituency of Middlesex.

The table is only illustrative and not to scale.

See also 
 List of parliamentary constituencies in London

C